Duduma Waterfall is situated  in the border of Koraput (Odisha)  districts of India.

Geography 
It has two sub-waterfalls, one on the Odisha side and the other on the Andhra Pradesh side. Duduma is about 92 km from Koraput and about 177 km from Visakhapatnam.

Hydroelectric project 
Machhakund (Duduma) Hydroelectric Project is located near Duduma Falls. It is a collaborative project between the Government of Andhra Pradesh and the Government of Odisha. The project, consisting of 6 units, has an installed capacity of 120 MW.

Tourism 
Machkund is a pilgrimage destination. The aboriginal tribe of Bonda, Gadaba, and paraja's live near this waterfall.

Gallery

See also
List of waterfalls in India
List of waterfalls in India by height

References

Waterfalls of Andhra Pradesh
Waterfalls of Odisha